Plymouth Township is a township in Plymouth County, Iowa in the United States. The township is named after.

The elevation of Plymouth Township is listed as 1178 feet above mean sea level.

References

Townships in Iowa